Strawberry Cliff is a 2011 Hong Kong thriller film written and directed by Chris Chow, who has participated in writing scripts for films such as Fearless and Blood: The Last Vampire. It stars Eason Chan and Leslie-Anne Huff and was filmed in both Hong Kong and Los Angeles. The film also features Eason Chan in his first English language role and Chris Chow in his directorial debut.

Plot
Kate has a supernatural power, that with one look, she can tell a person's time of death without any mistake. One day in a restaurant in Seattle, she meets Jason who is going to die a few hours later. She made a deal with Jason that if he reincarnates to his next life, he will tell her about it and let her know what is reincarnation.

That night, as Kate predicted, Jason died and that last moment before he dies, he saw a horrible image.

Days later, Kate receives a "reincarnation" phone call. Frightened, she follows the phone caller's instruction and leaves from Los Angeles to Hong Kong and there she meets Daren. Daren is a bartender, because he has an "incomplete spirit", he feels depressed. Darren and Kate investigate about the journey of reincarnation and found out the truth of the horrible image that Jason saw before his death.

Kate finds out that her father, the first person whose death she ever predicted, was the cause of all the deaths occurring around her. She was stricken with health problems since her birth and was never supposed to live. So her father, once dead, has been killing people around her to preserve Kate's life. "Others' lives aren't as important as yours" he would say.

The final scene shows Jean, the third person who shares a mind with Jason and Darren, finally meeting Kate. Jean tells her the tale of the strawberry cliff, emphasizing on how sweet death is.

Cast
Eason Chan as Darren
Leslie-Anne Huff as Kate
Roy Werner as Kate's father
Kimberly Estrada as Maggie Johnston
Anthony Chaput as Jason
Antonella Monceau as Jeanne
David Alan Graf as Doctor
Eli Klien as Young Jason
Brian Maslow as Travel Agent
David Oxley as George
Lee Perkins as Grouchy Customer
Shawna Sutherland as Gabriella
Bogdan Szumilas as Homeless man

External links
 
 
 Irresistible Films website
 aaiff 2011
 Cinespot: Starwberry Cliff
 《贖命》：眼高手低，故弄玄虛
 now movie website

2011 films
Hong Kong fantasy thriller films
2010s fantasy thriller films
Hong Kong supernatural thriller films
2010s supernatural thriller films
Films set in Hong Kong
Films shot in Hong Kong
Films set in Los Angeles
Films shot in Los Angeles
2011 directorial debut films
2010s English-language films
2010s Hong Kong films